Skidway Lake is an unincorporated community and census-designated place (CDP) in Ogemaw County in the U.S. state of Michigan.  The population was 3,392 at the 2010 census, which makes it the most populated community in Ogemaw County.  Skidway Lake is located within Mills Township.

History
Skidway Lake had its own post office from 1959 to 1999.

Geography

The community takes its name from Skidway Lake, although the census-designated place contains numerous other smaller lakes including Black Lake, Bush Lake, Elbow Lake, Feeding Ground Lake, Little Feeding Ground Lake, Lost Lake, Norway Lake, and Turtle Lake.  The Rifle River forms the western border of the census-designated place, while the smaller Silver Creek runs through the center of the community.

Demographics

As of the census of 2000, there were 3,147 people, 1,326 households, and 883 families residing in the CDP. The racial makeup of the CDP was 95.68% White, 0.35% African American, 1.68% Native American, 0.03% from other races, and 2.26% from two or more races. Hispanic or Latino of any race were 1.43% of the population.

There were 1,326 households, out of which 25.3% had children under the age of 18 living with them, 49.0% were married couples living together, 11.8% had a female householder with no husband present, and 33.4% were non-families. 27.7% of all households were made up of individuals, and 14.1% had someone living alone who was 65 years of age or older.  The average household size was 2.37 and the average family size was 2.84.

In the CDP, the population was spread out, with 22.6% under the age of 18, 7.4% from 18 to 24, 24.4% from 25 to 44, 26.6% from 45 to 64, and 19.1% who were 65 years of age or older.  The median age was 42 years. For every 100 females, there were 100.7 males.  For every 100 females age 18 and over, there were 97.3 males.

The median income for a household in the CDP was $20,806, and the median income for a family was $24,637. Males had a median income of $24,659 versus $15,850 for females. The per capita income for the CDP was $11,405.  About 20.4% of families and 25.3% of the population were below the poverty line, including 30.0% of those under age 18 and 14.7% of those age 65 or over.

References

Unincorporated communities in Ogemaw County, Michigan
Census-designated places in Michigan
Unincorporated communities in Michigan
Census-designated places in Ogemaw County, Michigan